Port-Bail-sur-Mer is a commune in the Manche department in north-western France. It was established on 1 January 2019 by merger of the former communes of Portbail (the seat), Denneville and Saint-Lô-d'Ourville.

See also
Communes of the Manche department

References

Communes of Manche
Populated places established in 2019
2019 establishments in France
Populated coastal places in France